The King's African Rifles (KAR) was a multi-battalion British colonial regiment raised from British possessions in East Africa from 1902 until independence in the 1960s. It performed military and internal security functions within the colonial territories and served outside these territories during the world wars. The rank and file (askaris) were drawn from native inhabitants, while most of the officers were seconded from the British Army. When the KAR was first raised there were some Sudanese officers in the battalions raised in Uganda and native officers were commissioned towards the end of British colonial rule.

Uniforms

Until independence, the parade uniform of the KAR comprised khaki drill, with tall fezzes and cummerbunds. The latter items were normally red, although there were some battalion distinctions with Nyasaland units, for example, wearing black fezzes. Prior to 1914, the regiment's field service uniforms consisted of a dark blue jersey and puttees, khaki shorts and a khaki fez cover with integral foldable cloth peak and neck flap. Askaris wore sandals or were barefoot, on the rationale that the heavy military boots of the period were unsuitable for African recruits who had not previously worn footwear. Fezzes bore an Arabic or Roman number with the wartime-raised battalions wearing theirs on geometric-shaped patches of cloth. During the Great War, all the dark blue items were replaced with khaki equivalents and a short pillbox hat with a khaki cover was worn on campaign. After the war, the khaki shirt was replaced by a collarless blue-grey angora shirt called a "greyback". Officers and senior NCOs wore slouch hats with coloured hackles.

Formation
Six battalions were formed in 1902 by the amalgamation of the Central Africa Regiment (CAR), East Africa Rifles (EAR) and Uganda Rifles, with one or two battalions located in each of Nyasaland, Kenya, Uganda and British Somaliland.
 1st (Nyasaland) Battalion [1902–1964] with eight companies (formerly 1CAR)
 2nd (Nyasaland) Battalion [1902–1963] with six companies (formerly 2CAR)
The 1st and 2nd Battalions were also known as the 1st and 2nd Central African Battalions.
 3rd (Kenya) Battalion [1902–1963] with seven companies and a camel company (formerly the East African Rifles)
 4th (Uganda) Battalion [1902–1962] with nine companies (formerly the African Companies of the Uganda Rifles)
 5th (Uganda) Battalion [1902–1904] with four companies (formerly the Indian Contingent of the Uganda Rifles) – the senior battalion as it was the first to be raised.
 6th (British Somaliland) Battalion [1902–1910] formed from three infantry companies, the camel corps, militia and mounted infantry of the local forces in British Somaliland.

On formation, there was no regular staff system in connection with these six battalions beyond the usual regimental staff and an Inspector-General who made two annual tours and reported to the Foreign Office.

The 5th and 6th battalions were disbanded by 1910 as a cost-saving measure by the Colonial Office and out of white-settler concern over the existence of a large indigenous armed force.

Operational history

Somaliland campaigns
During the early 1900s the King's African Rifles took part in the Somaliland campaign against Mohammed Abdullah Hassan (known to the British as the 'Mad Mullah') and the Dervishes. Lt-Col. Alexander Cobbe of 1st (Central Africa) Battalion KAR, was awarded the Victoria Cross for his action at Erego, on 6 October 1902.

The KAR were part of the British air and ground force that defeated the Dervish movement in 1920.

First World War

The KAR began the First World War with 21 small companies in three battalions (each with up to eight companies following the British pre-1913 half-company establishment): the 1st Nyasaland (half of the battalion was located in the northeast Nyasaland), 3rd East Africa (with one company on Zanzibar) and the 4th Uganda, both of the latter included the 4th platoon of Sudanese with the 4th platoon of 4th battalion being led by Sudanese officers. Additionally, the companies were scattered over British East Africa.

Full strength of the KAR in 1914 was 70 British officers, three British NCOs, and 2,325 Africans. There were no organic heavy weapons (each company had one machine gun), including artillery or organised reserves and the companies were, in reality, large platoons of 70 to 80 men.

In 1915 the KAR was expanded by having the three battalions reorganised into standard four-company battalions, which were then brought up to full strength at 1,045 men each. It was not until early 1916 that the 2nd Nyasaland and 5th Kenya battalions [1916–1963] were re-raised, this being due to do with white sensitivities in Kenya about arming and training large numbers of black African troops. Later in 1916 the 2nd, 3rd and 4th battalions were expanded into two battalions each through recruiting in their home areas. It was not until General Hoskins (formerly the Inspector General of the KAR) was appointed to command British East African forces in 1917 that genuine expansion began. The 1st Battalion was doubled and the 6th (Tanganyika Territory) Battalion was raised from Schutztruppe of the former German East Africa and then it too was doubled. The 7th was formed from the Zanzibar Armed Constabulary and the Mafia Constabulary. Later in 1917 many other duplicate battalions were created as the first four battalions (now called regiments in the British tradition) each raised a 3rd battalion and a 4th or Training Battalion. The 4th Regiment raised an additional two battalions, the 5th, and 6th through recruiting in Uganda. The KAR Mounted Infantry Unit (on camels), originally part of the 3rd regiment and the KAR Signals Company were also raised.

Thus in late 1918, the KAR consisted of 22 battalions as follows:
 Western Force: 1st KAR Regiment with 1st, 2nd, and 3rd Battalions; plus 1st and 2nd Battalions 4th KAR Regt
 Eastern Force: 2nd KAR Regiment with 1st, 2nd and 3rd Battalions; 1st and 2nd Battalion of the 3rd KAR; plus 3rd and 4th Battalions 4th KAR Regt
 German East Africa Garrison: 3rd Battalion of the 3rd KAR, 5th battalion of the 4th KAR, 2nd battalion of the 6th KAR, 1st Battalion of the 7th KAR.
 British East Africa Garrison: 1st Battalion of the 5th KAR, 1st Battalion of the 6th KAR
 KAR Training Force: 4th Battalion 1st KAR, 4th Battalion 2nd KAR, 4th Battalion 3rd KAR, 6th Battalion 4th KAR

Part of the KAR's expansion involved bringing up unit strengths to the same size as British and Indian Army Imperial Service units, while also increasing the numbers of white officers and NCOs. The increase in cadres was difficult due to the shortage of Swahili-speaking whites, as many white settlers had already formed segregated units such as the East African Mounted Rifles, the East African Regiment, the Uganda Volunteer Rifles and the Zanzibar Volunteer Defence Force.

The regiment fought in the East African Campaign against the German commander Paul Erich von Lettow-Vorbeck and his forces in German East Africa. Transport and support into the interior were provided by over 400,000 porters of the Carrier Corps.

By the end of the Great War, the KAR comprised 1,193 British officers, 1,497 British NCOs and 30,658 Africans (33,348 total) in 22 battalions, including two made up of former German askaris, as noted above. In Armies in East Africa 1914–18, Peter Abbot notes that the KAR units recruited from former prisoners of war were used as garrison troops by the British, to avoid any conflict of loyalties. However, one of these battalions was involved in the pursuit of a force under Hauptman Wintgens from February to October 1917.

KAR casualties in the First World War were 5,117 killed and wounded with another 3,039 dying from diseases.

Inter-war period
During the interwar period, the KAR was slowly demobilised to a peacetime establishment of six battalions, at which strength the regiment remained until the Second World War. In 1938, the regiment was composed of two brigade-strength units organised as a "Northern Brigade" and a "Southern Brigade." The combined strength of both units amounted to 94 officers, 60 non-commissioned officers, and 2,821 African other ranks. After the outbreak of war, these units provided the trained nucleus for the rapid expansion of the KAR. By March 1940, the strength of the KAR had reached 883 officers, 1,374 non-commissioned officers, and 20,026 African other ranks.

Second World War

The KAR fought in several campaigns during World War II. It fought against the Italians in Italian East Africa during the East African Campaign, against the Vichy French in Madagascar during the Battle of Madagascar, and against the Japanese in Burma during the Burma Campaign. The Somaliland battalions were heavily involved in defending the colony against the Italian invasion of August 1940, but were forced to retreat and evacuate after defeat in the Battle of Tug Argan from 11–15 August.

Initially, KAR units were deployed as part of the 1st East African Infantry Brigade and the 2nd East African Infantry Brigade. The first brigade was responsible for coastal defence and the second for the defence of the interior. (See 1st SA Infantry Division). By the end of July 1940, two additional East African brigades were formed, the 3rd East African Infantry Brigade and the 6th East African Infantry Brigade. Initially a Coastal Division and a Northern Frontier District Division were planned, but, instead, the 11th African Division and the 12th African Division was formed.

The two divisions included East African, Ghanaian, Nigerian, and South African troops. The Ghanaian and Nigerian troops came from the Royal West African Frontier Force. Under the terms of a war contingency plan, a brigade each was provided from the Gold Coast (now Ghana) and from Nigeria for service in Kenya. A Nigerian brigade, together with two East African brigades (the KAR brigades) and some South Africans, formed the 11th African Division. The 12th African Division was similarly formed, but with the Ghanaian brigade instead of the Nigerian brigade.

In 1941, during the East African Campaign, Sergeant Nigel Gray Leakey of the 1/6th Battalion was awarded the Victoria Cross (VC).

The 11th African Division was disbanded in November 1941 and the 12th African Division was disbanded in April 1943. In 1943, the 11th (East Africa) Division was formed and it fought in Burma. In addition, two independent infantry brigades were sent from East Africa to India for service in Burma. The 22 (East Africa) Infantry Brigade served in the Arakan under command of XV Indian Corps, while the 28th (East Africa) Infantry Brigade served under IV Corps, playing a crucial role in the crossing of the Irrawaddy River.

By the end of the war, the regiment had raised forty-three battalions (including two in British Somaliland), nine independent garrison companies, an armoured car regiment, an artillery unit, as well as engineer, signal and transport sections.

After the Second World War

The regiment played a major role in operations during the Mau Mau Uprising in Kenya. In 1952, the 7th (Kenya) Battalion was reformed; it was renumbered as the 11th (Kenya) Battalion in 1956. 2nd/3rd Battalion, a reserve unit, was raised during the military phase of the emergency in Kenya and was under consideration for disbandment by 1957. A company of the regiment was accused of  war crimes in connection with the Chuka massacre in June, 1953.

The 1st, 2nd, and 3rd battalions saw service in the Malayan Emergency, where they were heavily involved in fighting Communist rebels, suffering 23 dead.

The regiment was retitled the East African Land Forces in 1957. The last Colonel-in-Chief of the KAR was HM Queen Elizabeth II.

When the various territories from which the KAR was recruited became independent, the regiment began to break up:
 1st Battalion1st Battalion, Malawi Rifles
 2nd Battalion2nd Battalion, Northern Rhodesia Regiment (subsequently Zambia Regiment)
 3rd Battalion3rd Battalion, Kenya Rifles
 4th Battalion1st Battalion, Uganda Rifles (later formed basis of the Ugandan Army)
 5th Battalion5th Battalion, Kenya Rifles
 6th Battalion1st Battalion, Tanganyika Rifles
 11th Battalion11th Battalion, Kenya Rifles
 26th Battalion2nd Battalion, Tanganyika Rifles

The extent to which KAR traditions influence the modern national armies of the former East African colonies varies from country to country. In Tanzania, a mutiny in 1964 led to a conscious decision to move away from the British military model. In Kenya, on the other hand, the title of Kenya Rifles survives and the various campaigns in which the KAR distinguished itself in both World Wars are still commemorated.
On the island of Mauritius which is located off the eastern coast of Africa, a detachment of the King's African Rifles was present until 1960. It was gradually replaced by the newly formed Special Mobile Force (SMF) and Police Riot Unit (PRU).

Only the Kenya Rifles and the Malawi Rifles still exist.

Battle honours
The regiment's battalions were not awarded colours until 1924, as colours were not traditionally carried by rifle regiments. The colours had many of the regiment's battle honours emblazoned on it. The old colours were replaced in the 1950s.
 Ashanti 1900 (awarded 1908 for services of The Central Africa Regiment), British Somaliland 1901–04
 The Great War (7 battalions): Kilimanjaro, Narungombe, Nyangao, East Africa 1914–18
 The Second World War: Afodu, Moyale, Todenyang-Namuraputh, Soroppa, Juba, Beles Gugani, Awash, Fike, Colito, Omo, Gondar, Ambazzo, Kulkaber, Abyssinia 1940–41, Tug Argan: British Somaliland 1940, Madagascar, Middle East 1942, Mawlaik, Kalewa, Seikpyu, Letse, Arakan Beaches, Taungup, Burma 1944–45

List of commanders
Inspectors-general
 October 1901 – 1907 Brigadier-General William Henry Manning
 John Gough
 1909 – 1913 Colonel George Thesiger

Notable servicemen

 Gen. Sir George Giffard (1886-1964)- Served K.A.R. 1913-1919, British Army officer
 Lt-Gen. David Musuguri (b.1920)- Served K.A.R. 1942-1957, Tanzanian People's Defence Force officer
 Maj-Gen. Sir Freddie de Guingand (1900-1979)- Served K.A.R. 1926-1931, British Army officer
 Maj-Gen. John Butler Walden (1939-2002)- Served K.A.R. 1957-1961, Tanzanian People's Defence Force officer
 Brig-Gen. Shaban Opolot (1924-2005)- Served K.A.R. 1945-1962, Ugandan Army officer
 Brig-Gen. Henry Walker DSO (1874-1953)- Served K.A.R. 1900-1910, British Army officer
 Col. Richard Meinertzhagen (1878-1967)- Served K.A.R. 1902-1906, British intelligence officer and ornithologist
 Lt-Col. Colin Mitchell (1925-1996)- Served K.A.R. 1960s, British soldier and politician
 Lt-Col. Eric Wilson VC (1912-2008)- Served K.A.R. 1937-1946, British Army officer and recipient of the Victoria Cross
 Cpt. Tracy Philipps MC (1888-1959)- Served K.A.R. 1913-1917, British public servant
 Cpt. David Gordon Hines (1915-2000)- Served K.A.R. 1939-1942, British accountant and colonial administrator
 Lt. Idi Amin (1925-2003)- Served 1946-1962, President of Uganda (1971-1979)
 Lt. Roald Dahl (1916-1990)- Served K.A.R. 1939, British novelist and childrens author
 Lt. Peter Hopkirk (1930-2014)- Served 1950s, British journalist and historian
 Lt. George Shepperson (1922-2020)- Served 1943-1946, British historian
 2-Lt. Cyril Taylor (1935-2018)- Served 1954-1956, British educationist and social entrepreneur
 Sgt. Nigel Leakey VC (1913-1941)- Served 1939-1941, British soldier and recipient of the Victoria Cross
 Cpl. Waruhiu Itote (1922-1993)- Served 1942-1945, leading figure of the Mau Mau rebellion
 Robert Fraser (1937-1986)- Served 1950s, British art-dealer
 P. J. Marshall (b.1933)- Served 1950s, British historian
 John Nunneley (1922-2013)- Served 1941-1945, British Army officer and businessman
 John Seymour (1914-2004)- Served 1939-1945, British author and activist

See also
 African Distinguished Conduct Medal
 Bikaner Camel Corps
 Gold Coast in World War II
 History of Anglo-Egyptian Sudan
 Kenya in World War II
 Kenya Regiment
 
 King's African Rifles Long Service and Good Conduct Medal
 Nyasaland in World War II
 Order of Battle, East African Campaign (World War II)
 Rhodesian African Rifles
 Somaliland Camel Corps
 Southern Rhodesia in World War II
 Sudan Defence Force

Notes

References

External links

 African Formations – Burma 1930–1947

Further reading
 Malcolm Page, King's African Rifles: A History (Hardcover), Pen & Sword, 2006

British colonial regiments
British Kenya
East Africa
Military history of Kenya
East African Campaign (World War I)
Military units and formations of British Somaliland in World War II
Military units and formations established in 1902
Military units and formations disestablished in the 1960s
1902 establishments in the British Empire